"More Than This" is a song by English rock band Roxy Music. It was released in April 1982 as the first single from their eighth and final studio album, Avalon (1982). "More Than This" was the group's last top-10 UK hit, peaking at  6 on the UK Singles Chart, and also charted in the United States, reaching No. 58 on the Billboard Rock Top Tracks chart.

American alternative rock band 10,000 Maniacs released a successful cover version in 1997 which peaked at No. 25, and British singer Emmie released a cover that reached No. 5 in the UK in January 1999. The cover of the single's release is the painting Veronica Veronese, by Dante Gabriel Rossetti, which was completed in 1872 with Alexa Wilding as the model.

The work, which was not one of the band's biggest hits initially, later became one of Roxy Music's "most beloved songs". With its "lush and romantic" audio and "wistul" lyrics, it has been included in a number of movies and televisions shows, and is played on one of the in-game radio stations in Grand Theft Auto: Vice City.

The song's narrator is hopeful about the existence of something more, but vaguely melancholic about there not being so.

Composition
The song was written by lead vocalist Bryan Ferry, who has stated in interviews that he began writing the songs for Avalon while on the western coast of Ireland, which he believes contributed to the dark melancholy of the album.

"More than This" is somewhat unusual for a pop song in that Ferry's lead vocals end at 2:45 minutes, leaving the last 1:45 minutes as a synthesizer-driven instrumental outro.

Personnel
Musicians
 Bryan Ferry – lead vocals, keyboards
 Phil Manzanera – lead guitar
 Andy Mackay – saxophone
 Neil Hubbard – guitar
 Alan Spenner – bass guitar
 Jimmy Maelen – percussion
 Fonzi Thornton – backing vocals
 Andy Newmark – drums

Charts

Weekly charts

Year-end charts

Certifications

Cover versions
In 1997, a cover performed by 10,000 Maniacs with Mary Ramsey on lead vocals was a single from their album Love Among the Ruins becoming a US hit when it reached No. 25 on the Billboard Hot 100 on the week ending 29 August 1997. The version also debuted at its peak position, No. 87, on the UK Singles Chart on the week ending 28 September 1997. The video for the cover was filmed at House on the Rock. A live version was also included on their 2016 album Playing Favorites. 

English singer-songwriter Emmie recorded a cover of the song and released it as a single on 11 January 1999. Produced by Mark Hadfield and Adam Carter-Ryan, her version of the song peaked at No. 5 on the UK Singles Chart, No. 25 on the Irish Singles Chart, and No. 39 in the Flanders region of Belgium.

References

External links
 

Roxy Music songs
Songs written by Bryan Ferry
1980s ballads
1982 songs
1982 singles
British soft rock songs
Polydor Records singles
Atco Records singles
Warner Records singles
E.G. Records singles
10,000 Maniacs songs